Rivula aequalis is a moth of the family Erebidae first described by Francis Walker in 1863. It is found in Sri Lanka, the Indian subregion, Japan, Sundaland, the Philippines and Sulawesi.

Its wings are a pale straw colour and narrower than other relative species. A transverse, bipunctate blackish discal mark is present. There is an oblique, centrally zigzag, submarginal row of diffuse, dark patches. In the female, the hindwings are slightly darker yellower than that of male. But the male has dark greyish scaling with a dark discal spot. Larval host plants are Bambusa species.

References

Moths of Asia
Moths described in 1863
Erebidae
Rivulinae